North Andros is one of the 31 districts of the Bahamas. It is also the largest district (in area) in the country. It has some of the largest settlements on Andros Island and many churches as well. The population (2010 Census) is 3,898.

Churches 

There are a number of church denominations represented within Andros.  In North Andros, the Anglican Episcopal Church has a presence through St. Margaret's Parish.  This parish consist of two churches: St. Margaret's, located in the settlement of Nicholl's Town; and St. Mary Magdalene, located in the settlement of Mastic Point. There are two denominations of Methodist Churches. (MCCA) Wesley Methodist church  is located in Mastic Point, while Wesley Mt. Zion is at Nicholl's Town. (BCMC) Wesley Methodist is located at Mastic Point. There is also the Church of God of Prophecy.  Branches may be found in Lowe Sound, Mastic Point, Staniard Creek and Conch Sound, the latter having the most membership. The Church of God of Prophecy in Conch Sound is home for the "Rushin" Bahamian Culture that is held on a yearly basis around New Year's time.

Settlements 
Prevalent settlements in North Andros are:
Red Bays
Morgan's Bluff
Lowe Sound
Nicholls Town
Conch Sound
San Andros
Mastic Point
Stafford Creek
Blanket Sound
Staniard Creek
Love Hill

References

External 
St Margaret's Anglican Episcopal Church in North Andros

Districts of the Bahamas
Islands of the Bahamas
Andros, Bahamas